Donald's Dream Voice is a 1948 American animated short film featuring Donald Duck; the film was directed by Jack Hannah and produced by Walt Disney. In the short film, no one understands a word that salesman Donald says, so he takes voice pills to improve his speech.

Plot
Donald the salesman has a problem where he fails to sell brushes throughout the neighbourhood, because no one can understand what he says. At Daisy Duck's house, Daisy reassures Donald and tells him she believes in him.

Finally, he finds a solution to clear his voice: taking a voice pill, leading to a massive increase in his brush sales.

The pill increases Donald's confidence too and makes him eager to ask Daisy to marry him. After he sells all the brushes, he loses the pills along the way, leaving him only one. Then he goes back to Daisy's house, just as his new voice reverts to his old voice. When he tries to take the pill, it falls to the ground and bounces away from him and he starts following it.

Donald chases the pill through the streets and onto the hat of a particularly large and irritable sewer worker, and then it finally ends up in the mouth of a cow, which causes her to talk in a clear and polite male voice, with Donald taunting her for his last pill. Unfortunately, the cow can't understand Donald's voice, causing Donald to lose his temper.

Voice cast
 Clarence Nash as Donald Duck
 Leslie Denison as Donald Duck's intelligible voice and Talking Cow
 Ruth Clifford as Daisy Duck
 Bea Benaderet as Unseen Lady Customer

Television
 Disneyland, episode #1.4: "The Donald Duck Story"
 Walt Disney's Wonderful World of Color, episode #8.6: "Inside Donald Duck"
 Good Morning, Mickey, episode #32
 Donald Duck Presents, episode #8
 Mickey's Mouse Tracks, episode #49
 Donald's Quack Attack, episode #91
 The Ink and Paint Club, episode #1.40: "Crazy Over Daisy"

Home media
The short was released on December 11, 2007, on Walt Disney Treasures: The Chronological Donald, Volume Three: 1947-1950.

Additional releases include:
 Walt Disney Cartoon Classics: Limited Gold Editions - Daisy (VHS)
 Walt Disney's Classic Cartoon Favorites: Best Pals - Donald and Daisy (DVD)

References

External links 
 
 Donald's Dream Voice at The Internet Animation Database
 Donald's Dream Voice on BFI
 Donald's Dream Voice on Filmaffinity
 Donald's Dream Voice on Disney Film Project

1948 animated films
1948 short films
1940s English-language films
Donald Duck short films
Films produced by Walt Disney
1940s Disney animated short films
Films directed by Jack King
Films scored by Oliver Wallace
American animated short films
RKO Pictures short films
RKO Pictures animated short films
Films about ducks
Films about salespeople